A parasol is a type of umbrella made for protection from the sun.

Parasol may also refer to:

Places
 Parasol, United States Virgin Islands, a settlement
 Ile Parasol (Parasol Island), British Indian Ocean Territory
 Parasol Rocks, near the island of Huevos, Trinidad and Tobago

People
 Ruth Parasol (born 1967), founder of PartyGaming, the parent company of online poker site PartyPoker.com

Architecture
 Parasol, a roof or covering of a structure designed to provide cover from wind, rain, or sun
 Metropol Parasol , an umbrella-like structure in Seville, Spain

Arts, entertainment, and media
 Parasol (film), a 2015 Belgian film
 Parasol Records, a record label
 The Parasol, a cartoon series of paintings by Francisco Goya
 Parasoul, a playable character in the 2D fighting game Skullgirls

Aviation
 Heath Parasol, an American parasol-winged, homebuilt monoplane first flown in 1926
 Nieuport-Macchi Parasol, an Italian artillery observation aircraft of World War I
 Parasol wing, a wing mounted above and away from an airplane fuselage
 REP Parasol, a French military reconnaissance aircraft of World War I

Biology
 Firmiana simplex, the Chinese parasol tree
 Parasol mushroom, a fungus
 Shaggy parasol, a fungus

Organizations
 Battalion Parasol, a unit of the Polish Home Army

Other uses
 Parasol (horse), a Thoroughbred racehorse
 Parasol (satellite), a French-built Earth-observing research satellite